John Henry Wisner (November 5, 1899 – December 15, 1981), known as "Big" Jack Wisner, was a professional baseball pitcher. He played all or part of four seasons in Major League Baseball between 1919 and 1926. He played for the Pittsburgh Pirates and New York Giants.

References

External links

Major League Baseball pitchers
Pittsburgh Pirates players
New York Giants (NL) players
Saginaw Aces players
Rochester Colts players
Rochester Tribe players
Indianapolis Indians players
Toledo Mud Hens players
Reading Keystones players
Baltimore Orioles (IL) players
New Haven Profs players
Eastern Michigan Eagles baseball players
Baseball players from Grand Rapids, Michigan
1899 births
1981 deaths